The Venerable W. is a 2016 documentary film by Swiss director Barbet Schroeder. It is his last film in his "Trilogy of Evil" which already consists of General Idi Amin Dada: A Self Portrait (1974) and Terror's Advocate (2007). Schroeder explores the daily occurrences  of racism and Islamophobia within Burmese society and how Buddhist monk Ashin Wirathu inflames the hatred within Myanmar's Buddhist majority population towards its Muslim minority through his rhetorics, which has catalysed riots and religious tensions.

The Venerable W. is 100 minutes in duration. The film premiered at the 2017 Cannes Film Festival was released in France in June 2017 and in Switzerland in November 2017.

Synopsis 
Schroeder focuses on the life of Ashin Wirathu, an influential and Islamophobic Burmese Buddhist monk. Through his rhetoric, he has inflamed Myanmar's Buddhist majority population to commit acts of violence and persecutions towards the country's Muslim minority. These acts and persecutions were committed not just by Wirathu's ardent followers but also by certain people within the government of Myanmar. Houses owned by Muslims were burned down and thousands had no choice but to leave the country.

Production 
Schroeder admitted that he and his crew initially pretended to be foreign tourists. However, after about a month he realised that Myanmar's military police were following them. They even took photos of him and his crew visiting Myanmar's Muslim population. It did not take him long to leave the country.

Reception 
The Guardians Peter Bradshaw wrote that some of the scenes in the film reminded him of similar scenes in Joshua Oppenheimer's documentaries on Indonesian genocide The Act of Killing and The Look of Silence as well as Matthew Heineman's documentary on ISIS brutality in Raqqa, Syria City of Ghosts. He was also reminded of Belgian radio presenter Georges Ruggiu who provoked ethnic Hutu to attack against ethnic Tutsi in the lead up to the Rwandan genocide.

Varietys Jay Weissberg wrote that The Venerable W. reminded him of Schroeder's previous film, A Self Portrait, which even after the release of both films, both Idi Amin and Ashin Wirathu, the leading characters of respective film, are still influential and destructive.

References

External links

2017 films
2017 documentary films
French documentary films
Documentary films about Buddhism
Documentary films about Islam
Films directed by Barbet Schroeder
2010s French films